Rutherford Run is a  long first-order tributary to East Branch Tunungwant Creek.  This is the only stream of this name in the United States.

Course

Watershed

See also 
 List of rivers of Pennsylvania

References

Rivers of Pennsylvania
Tributaries of the Allegheny River
Rivers of McKean County, Pennsylvania